Baipenyao station is a station on the Fangshan line of the Beijing Subway.

History 
The station was originally called Fanyanglu. In August 2020, it was renamed to Baipenyao. The station opened on December 31, 2020.

Station Layout 
The station has 2 underground side platforms.

Exits 
There are 3 exits, lettered A, B, and D. Exit B is accessible via an elevator.

References 

Beijing Subway stations in Fengtai District
Railway stations in China opened in 2020